Kibsgaard is a Norwegian surname. Notable people with the surname include:

Paal Kibsgaard (born 1967), Norwegian petroleum engineer and businessman, chairman and CEO of Schlumberger
Per Kibsgaard-Petersen (born 1941), Norwegian banker and civil servant

Norwegian-language surnames